The Tajikistan Independence Day Military Parade is the main event of the Independence Day of Tajikistan. This parade is held every 5 years in Dushanbe on September 9. The participants in the parade are from agencies of the Armed Forces of the Republic of Tajikistan. The parade route is made up of Rudaki Avenue, Dousti Square and Hofizi Sherozi Avenue.

Summary of the parade

Arrival Honors and Parade Inspection 
At the sound of the Presidential Fanfare, the President of Tajikistan (in their capacity as commander-in-chief), followed by the Prime Minister of Tajikistan, the Mayor of Dushanbe, the Chief of the General Staff, the Minister of Internal Affairs, and the commanders of the different branches of the armed forces arrive on the central grandstand in front of the Ismoil Somoni Monument on Dousti Square. The president is then introduced by the master of ceremonies of the parade:

Please welcome,  the Founder of Peace and National Unity, Leader of the Nation, President of the Republic of Tajikistan, Supreme Commander in Chief of the Armed Forces, the esteemed, (states president's name, currently is Emomali Rahmon)

The parade then prepares for its inspection by the Minister of Defense. As the minister approaches the ceremonial commander of the parade (usually the Dushanbe Garrison Commander), the massed bands play an inspection march. The parade commander then, salutes him and says "Comrade Minister of Defense of the Republic of Tajikistan, the troops of the Dushanbe Garrison, in honor of the anniversary of the independence of the Republic of Tajikistan are ready for inspection!". The minister will then inspect the troops and congratulate them on the holiday in the following manner:

Minister: Hello Comrades of the (states name of unit/formation/academy)Formation: Greetings Comrade Minister of Defence!Minister: Congratulations on the occasion of the anniversary of the independence of the Republic of Tajikistan!

After the inspection finishes, the minister reports to the president on the status of the parade. While the minister makes their way to the grandstand, all of the participating troops sound a threefold Hurray as the minister passes by.

Holiday Address and Parade Orders
After the president greets the participants of the parade, the National anthem of Tajikistan (Surudi Milli) is then played. The president then delivers a speech and congratulates the troops on the holiday. 
Following a salute to their commander in chief and threefold Oorah by the armed forces, the commander of the parade then gives the order for the Dushanbe Garrison to commence the march past in the following manner:

Parade... attention! Prepare for the solemn march past!Form battalions! Distance by a single lineman! First battalion will remain in the right, remainder... left.. turn!Slope.. arms!By the left!Quick...March!

Parade Proper 
After the parade commander orders the start of the parade, the troops of the Dushanbe Garrison march past the central tribune. After all the troops have paraded, the guard of honor drill team and the massed bands of the Dushanbe Garrison deliver a  performance. Finally, the massed bands leave the square and the President of Tajikistan greets the commanders of the parade formations.

List of parades

Full order of the parade

Massed Bands of the Dushanbe Garrison 
 Military Brass Band of the Ministry of Defense of the Republic of Tajikistan
 Corp of Drums of the Mastibek Tashmukhamedov Military Lyceum of the Ministry of Defense of Tajikistan

Ground Column 
 Cadets of the Mastibek Tashmukhamedov Military Lyceum of the Ministry of Defense of Tajikistan
 Armed Forces Veterans
 National Guard Units
 Female Personnel
 Ground Forces
 Air and Air Defense Forces
 Tajik Internal Troops
 Police Units
 Personnel of the Ministry of Justice
 Personnel of the Committee of Emergency Situations and Civil Defense of Tajikistan 
 Special Forces of the State Committee for National Security
 Tajik Border Troops
 Cadets of the Military Institute of the Ministry of Defense of Tajikistan
 Rapid Reaction Force personnel
 Dog Trainers
 Mounted Cavalry
 Honor Guard Company of the Ministry of Defense of Tajikistan

Foreign columns (2011)

Military music played during the parade 
 Navoi Iftixor (Song of Pride)
 Slow March of the Tajik Army
 March of the Preobrazhensky Regiment
 Jubilee Slow March "25 Years of the Red Army"
 Farewell of Slavianka

Broadcast 
The parade is broadcast on the following television channels:

 Televidenye Tajikistana
 1TV First Channel
 TV Varzish

See also 
 Independence Day (Tajikistan)
 Armed Forces Day (Tajikistan)
 Victory Day Parades

References

External links and sources 
 2001 Dushanbe Independence Day Parade
 2011 Dushanbe Independence Day Parade
 2016 Dushanbe Independence Day Parade
 В Душанбе показали огромный флаг и форму от Юдашкина
 20th anniversary of Tajikistan's independence

Military parades
Military of Tajikistan
September observances